Tetas may refer to:

Tetas de Liérganes, a mountain in Cantabria, Spain.
Tetas de Viana, twin mountains in Guadalajara Province, Spain
Tetas de María Guevara, Isla Margarita, Venezuela
Tetas de Cerro Gordo in San Germán, Puerto Rico
Cerro Las Tetas in Salinas, Puerto Rico 
Cerro de Las Tetas, Serranía del Perijá, La Guajira, Colombia
Cerro de Las Tetas, Chile
Cerro Tres Tetas in Potosí, Bolivia
Cerro Tetas, Chiclayo Province, Peru
Cerro de Las Tetas, Tinaquillo, Cojedes, Venezuela
Cerro las Tres Tetas, Barquisimeto, Venezuela
Cerro Tres Tetas, Argentina
Tres Tetas Mountain or El Chichión in Costa Grande of Guerrero, Mexico
Los Tetas, a Chilean Funk band 
Sin tetas no hay paraíso, a Colombian television series

See also
Teta (disambiguation)